Bunny suit may refer to:

 A cleanroom suit
 An NBC suit
 An outfit worn by a Playboy Bunny
 A costume that resembles a rabbit